was a Japanese popular music group consisting of two female singers: Ai and Saki. They have released ten singles and two studio albums. They are officially described as a "Hip-hop/R&B Dance Unit."

History
Originally from the Kansai region, the band was formed as the result of an audition contest called "Real Street Project," held by Sony Records. RSP was selected out of over 5000 competitors to win a record deal and become formally released.

They debuted with the single "A Street Story" in December 2006, which made the Kansai top ten list in sales. The band was featured in a television documentary, and later played a major part in producing a television program entitled "Street Dance Drama."

In August 2007, the band released their second single, "Lifetime Respect: 女編" (Onna Hen), which derives from the song "Lifetime Respect" by Miki Dōzan and includes samples from the earlier work. The band describes their version as an "answer-song." This second single debuted at #5 on the Oricon hit list and moved up to #4 shortly afterwards.

Their song, "Kansha" was used as the fourteenth ending theme for the anime Bleach, and was released as a single on 6 February 2008.

In June 2009, the band released their seventh single, "アンマー～母唄～" ("Anma~HaHa Uta~"), which is a cover of the song "アンマー" ("Anma") by Kariyushi58 (かりゆし58), an Okinawan rock-reggae band. The word "アンマー" ("Anma") means Mother in Okinawan.

The song "Dice" has also come out with a music video, even though it was not produced as a single, but it is on the studio album "Dice".

Real Street Project once again contributed a song for Bleach with their 9th single, "Tabidatsu kimi e" used as its twenty-second ending. The single was released on 10 March 2010.

On 14 June 2010, it was announced that Real Street Project would be attending and performing in the United States at Anime Expo, as official guests of honor. Real Street Project held their concert on 1 July 2010 at Nokia Plaza. The Bleach ending songs, "Tabidatsu Kimi e" and "Kansha", along with their latest single "Ai Kotoba", were some of the songs they performed. It was their first live concert outside Japan.

Real Street Project's tenth single, "Ai Kotoba" was released on 7 July 2010.

Real Street Project's second studio album, entitled "ii" was released on 29 September 2010. The album is also packaged with a DVD that contains several music videos and footage of Real Street Project's trip to Los Angeles for Anime Expo 2010.

On 3 November 2013, they made their final show at Shinsaibashi Club Drop (Osaka).

Members
Vocalists
Ai (Ai Matsuo) (b. 16 June 1985)
Saki (Sakiko Yayama) (b. 18 December 1981)

Discography

Singles

Albums

References

External links
 Official Site (Japanese)
 Sony Artist page (Japanese)
 Official Blog (Japanese)
 RSP page at Yomiuri TV (Japanese)
 Real Street Drama at Yomiuri TV (Japanese)
 RSP members' blog (Japanese)

Japanese dance musicians
Japanese pop music groups
Japanese girl groups
Musical groups established in 2006
Japanese hip hop groups
Sony Music Entertainment Japan artists
Musical groups disestablished in 2013